Andrea Stuart (born 1962) is a Barbadian-British historian and writer, who was raised in the Caribbean and the US and now lives in the UK. Her biography of Josephine Bonaparte, entitled The Rose of Martinique, won the Enid McLeod Literary Prize in 2004. Although her three published books so far have been non-fiction, she has spoken of working on a novel set in the 18th century.

Early years
Born in Jamaica, of Barbadian parents, Andrea Stuart spent many of her early years there, where her father was Dean of the medical school at the University College of the West Indies. She moved to England with her family when she was 14, in 1976. She studied English at the University of East Anglia and French at the Sorbonne. She began working as a journalist, then branched into publishing and television documentary production.

Writing
Stuart's first book was Showgirls (London: Jonathan Cape, 1996), a collective biography of showgirls through history to the present day, from Colette, to Marlene Dietrich, to Josephine Baker, to Madonna. It was adapted into a two-part documentary for the Discovery Channel in 1998, and since then has inspired a stage show, a dance piece and a number of burlesque performances.

In 2003 Stuart's second book, The Rose of Martinique: A Biography of Napoleon's Josephine, was published. Described by Kirkus Reviews as "unfailingly interesting", and by The Washington Post as "a comprehensive and truly empathetic biography", it won the Enid McLeod Literary Prize in 2004 and has been translated into several languages.

Her most recent book, Sugar in the Blood: A Family’s Story of Slavery and Empire, was published by Portobello Books in 2012, to much acclaim. It tells the story of slavery and colonialism in the Caribbean from the perspective of what Stuart learned about her own family's experience through seven generations from the 17th century. Amy Wilentz wrote in The New York Times: "In this multigenerational, minutely researched history, Stuart teases out these connections. She sets out to understand her family’s genealogy, hoping to explain the mysteries that often surround Caribbean family histories and to elucidate more important cultural and historic themes and events: the psychological aftereffects of slavery and the long relationship between sugar — 'white gold' — and forced labor.... Much of the fiery magic of this book arises from Stuart’s ability to knit together her imaginative speculations with family research, secondary sources and the work of historians of the region, including C. L. R. James and Adam Hochschild....There is not a single boring page in this book." Publishers Weekly referred to Stuart "Brilliantly weaving together threads of family history, political history, social history, and agricultural history into a vivid quilt covering the evolution of sugar—"white gold"—and slavery and sugar's impact on the development of Barbados as well as on her own family." Valerie Grove in The Times said: "A riveting story of family, slavery and the sugar trade…[Stuart belongs] in the canon of fine post-colonial writers." The Guardian′s reviewer described the book as "a diligently researched hybrid of family memoir and history ... absorbing". Margaret Busby in The Independent referred to it as "a magisterial work of history".

Stuart's work has appeared in numerous newspapers, magazines, and anthologies (including 2019's New Daughters of Africa, edited by Margaret Busby), and she has been co-editor of Black Film Bulletin and fiction editor of Critical Quarterly.

Awards and recognition
In 2004, Stuart won the Enid McLeod Literary Prize from the Franco-British Society for The Rose of Martinique: A Biography of Napoleon's Josephine.

Sugar in the Blood was shortlisted for the 2013 OCM Bocas Prize in the non-fiction category and for the Spear's Book Award, and was The Boston Globe′s non-fiction book of 2013.

In June 2014, Stuart was named by Ebony magazine as one of "six Caribbean writers you should take some time to discover" (alongside Mervyn Morris, Beverley East, Ann-Margaret Lim, Roland Watson-Grant, and Tiphanie Yanique, who were attending the Calabash Literary Festival in Jamaica).

Teaching and lecturing
Stuart has taught at Kingston University, as a Writer in Residence since 2011, and on the Biography course at Arvon. She was also a writing tutor with the Faber Academy, directing the "Writing Family History" course, and has been associate lecturer in cultural studies at the University of the Arts London, visiting lecturer in creative writing at City University London, and in cultural studies at Central Saint Martins.

Publications

Books
 Showgirls. London: Jonathan Cape, 1996
 The Rose of Martinique: A Biography of Napoleon's Josephine. Macmillan (1st edition), 2003. Reprint Grove Press / Atlantic Monthly Press, 2005
 Sugar in the Blood: A Family’s Story of Slavery and Empire. London: Portobello Books, 2012. USA: Knopf Publishing Group, 2013.

Selected articles

 "The Pirate's Daughter, by Margaret Cezair-Thompson", The Independent, 23 November 2007.
 "Strange Music, by Laura Fish – The poet, the plantation and history's lost lines", The Independent, 8 August 2008.
 "A Mercy, By Toni Morrison", The Independent, 7 November 2008.
  "The Dead Yard, By Ian Thomson; From Harvey River, By Lorna Goodison", The Independent, 22 May 2009.
 "Sugar: a bittersweet history, by Elizabeth Abbott", The Independent, 1 January 2010.
 "The Long Song, By Andrea Levy", The Independent, 5 February 2010.
 "The Sugar Barons: Family, Corruption, Empire and War, By Matthew Parker", The Independent, 6 May 2011.
 "Book of a Lifetime: Collected Poems, by Derek Walcott", The Independent, 30 June 2012.
 "Britain Needs to Confront its Past" , The Big Issue, 18 July 2012.
 "A bitter-sweet heritage", The Guardian, 1 September 2012.
 "Book review: Flappers: Six Women of a Dangerous Generation, By Judith Mackrell", The Independent, 26 July 2013.
 "Black History Month can only be declared a success once it's redundant", The Guardian, 31 October 2013.
 "Belle shows that at last, cinema is catching up with black history", Comment is free, The Guardian, 12 June 2014.
 "Britain's wealth was built on black backs. Windrush is a scandal of forgetting", The Guardian, 22 May 2018.

See also 

 Caribbean poetry
 Caribbean literature
 Postcolonial literature

References

External links
 "Sugar In The Blood: Andrea Stuart's Barbadian Legacy", Public Radio International, 6 June 2012. Audio interview from The World.
 "A Barbados Family Tree With 'Sugar In The Blood, NPR, 4 February 2013. Audio interview on Fresh Air.
 "Interview with Andrea Stuart", Black Book News, 29 September 2012.
 Rosebery Goring, "Andrea Stuart doesn't sugar the pill about slavery's role", The Herald (Scotland), 13 April 2013.
 Eric Herschthal, "The Original Slave Colony: Barbados and Andrea Stuart’s 'Sugar in the Blood, The Daily Beast, 23 January 2013.
 Jane Garvey talks to Andrea Stuart about the impact of discovering she was descended from both a slave owner and a slave, BBC, Woman's Hour, 11 June 2012.
 "Evening with Barbadian Andrea Stuart the author of Sugar in the Blood". YouTube. 9 November 2013.
 "Podcast 52: Interview with Andrea Stuart". , Friday, 14 February 2014. Interviewer: Karen Sanderson-Cole. University of the West Indies at St. Augustine, Trinidad and Tobago.
 Celeste Headlee, "A Family Tree That Includes Slaves — And Slave Owners" (interview), NPR, 15 August 2013.
 Andrea Stuart at Journalisted.

1962 births
Living people
20th-century Barbadian women writers
20th-century biographers
20th-century British women writers
21st-century Barbadian women writers
21st-century biographers
21st-century British women writers
21st-century historians
Alumni of the University of East Anglia
Barbadian historians
Barbadian women journalists
Black British women writers
British biographers
British people of Barbadian descent
British women journalists
Fellows of the Royal Society of Literature
Historians of slavery
Place of birth missing (living people)
Women biographers